Polar Caves Park is a set of glacially-formed caves located in New Hampshire's White Mountains region, in the United States. The caves were formed during the last ice age from granite boulders and are so named because the deepest cave is cold enough to allow snow to linger long into the summer.

The caves are a popular tourist destination. The park contains nine granite boulder caves connected by a series of boardwalks, a giant boulder maze, an animal park with European fallow deer and ducks, and a mining game for children. The caves are lighted, well-marked and relatively easy to traverse using walkways and stairs. They are naturally cool during the summer.

The caves were first discovered by Bernard A. Campbell, a student at Plymouth High School. Campbell was exploring the area with a group of friends in the summer of 1922 when they came across what appeared to be a small cave, and upon further exploration, they discovered a network of caves hidden beneath the forested area.

Campbell recognized the potential of the caves as a tourist attraction and shared his discovery with his science teacher, Henry Minot. Minot was impressed with the caves and contacted Arthur B. Thatcher, a local businessman, to share the discovery with him. Thatcher recognized the potential of the caves and soon purchased the land where the caves were located.

Thatcher then began developing the Polar Caves into a tourist attraction, clearing the forest and creating safe pathways for visitors to explore the caves. The first Polar Caves tour was conducted in 1923, and it quickly became a popular destination for tourists visiting the area.

Today, the Polar Caves remain a popular tourist attraction in New Hampshire, attracting visitors from all over the world who come to explore the unique geological formations and learn about the history of the area.

References

External links

Caves of New Hampshire
Tourist attractions in Grafton County, New Hampshire
Landforms of Grafton County, New Hampshire
Rumney, New Hampshire